Ulsanbawi, sometimes spelled Ulsan Rock, is a rock with 6 peaks. It is situated in Seoraksan National Park in Sokcho, Gangwon Province, South Korea. Ulsanbawi is one of the primary attractions of Seoraksan, along with Heundeulbawi, Biryeong waterfall (비룡폭포), and Yukdam waterfall (육담 폭포).

Geography

Ulsanbawi is located at Seorak Mountain. The exact location of Ulsanbawi is 1091 Seoraksan-ro, Sokcho, Gangwon-do.  
 
Ulsan Rock is 873m above sea level, and if we estimate it from the entrance of Seoraksan, the height is about 600 meters. It is in a folding screen shape. It is made up of cliffs on all sides and It consists of 6 peaks. The peak that consists of rock shows precipices that are almost vertical. Also, there are five crock-shaped holes. The rock's height is 200m and the slope is very steep. The circumference of Ulsanbawi is 4km. 
 
Seoraksan, which Ulsanbawi located on, is the highest mountain comprising Daebo granite interpenetrated in the Mesozoic. Especially, Ulsanbawi is terrain showing signs of differential erosion and weathering along granite facies well. Ulsanbawi is single rocky mountain which has endured weathering because it had less crack than surroundings except for the growing vegetation below. Under Ulsanbawi, it shows some of tafoni and tor by small-scale weathering.

Sinheungsa 

It is a head temple of the Jogye Order of Korean Buddhism. Sinheungsa is also located on Seoraksan National Park, near Ulsanbawi. 
In 652 (Jinduk Queen 6), the Jajang founded the temple of Orientation (香 城 寺). At that time, Gyeongjoam and Yeonginam were also built. At this time, the magnetic field is made up of a pagoda, and it is said that the pagoda (佛 舍利) was sealed. However, in the year of 698 (7th year of King Yejosa), the oriental temple was burnt down with a powerful cancer and remained in ruins for three years. 
In 701, Uisang(義湘) moved to the amphitheater, and the temple was rebuilt and the name of the temple was changed to the Seonjeongsa(禪定寺). At this time, Uisang(義湘) was enshrined in this section by forming the three Buddhist festivals of Amitabha, Gwanseumbosal, and Bodhisattva Bodhisattva. In 1644, while Yeongseo, Pungyo, and Hyeonwon originated in the middle of the middle, a new monk, who appeared in the same Koryoan temple three days a day. Recently, in October 1997, the world's largest bronze statue of 14.6m in height was laid in front of the order in 10 years after it was created. This Bronze statue of Great Buddha is also called "Unification Great Buddha", which was built with the desire for unification. The annexed hermitage is composed of Namwonam, which was built at the site of the temple, and Gyeongjoam, which was built in 655, and Anangyam, which was built in 1785 (Jeongjo 9).

Literature

Poems about Ulsanbawi 
People who lived in the Joseon Dynasty era wrote poems about Ulsanbawi. This is a list of poets who made poems about Ulsanbawi:

These are Korean names 
 Ju Sebung (Hangul: 주세붕; Hanja: 周世鵬; 1495-1554) 
 Mun Lyeo (Hangul: 문려; Hanja: 文勵; 1553-1605) 
 Heo Jeok (Hangul: 허적; Hanja: 許; 1563-1640) 
 Jowihan (Hangul: 조위한; Hanja: 趙緯韓; 1567-1649) 
 Lee Min Gu (Hangul: 이민구; Hanja: 李敏求; 1589-1670) 
 Osug (Hangul: 오숙; 1592-1634) 
 Lee Gyeong Seok(Hangul: 이경석; Hanja: 李景奭; 1595-1671) 
 Lee Dong Pyo (Hangul: 이동표; Hanja: 李東標; 1644-1700) 
 Lee Hae Jo (Hangul: 이해조; Hanja: 李海朝; 1660-1711) 
 Kim Chang Heub(Hangul: 김창흡; Hanja: 金昌翕; 1653-1722) 
 Jo Ha Mang (Hangul: 조하망; Hanja: 曺夏望; 1682-1747) 
 Lee Myeong Hwan (Hangul: 이명환; Hanja: 李明煥; 1718-1764) 
 Yu Gyeong Si (Hangul:유경시; Hanja: 柳敬時; 1666-1737) 

The poem “On Mt. Cheonhu” was written by Yu Gyeong Si (Hangul: 유경시; Hanja: 柳敬時; 1666-1737) who was a government official in the Joseon Dynasty. It is included in Yugeumgangsanlog (Hangul: 유금강산록; Hanja: 遊金剛山錄). The poem describes Ulsanbawi in the following:
It was a folding screen around a brick wall. 
Who could make a good cut? 
The trace of the past is already gone. 
The cave is just keeping its name. 

In 1746, Lee Myung Hwan (Hangul: 이명환; Hanja: 李明煥; 1718-1764) wrote a poem while traveling around Mt. Geumgang and Mt. Seorak along the eastern coast of Korea. This poem is included in Haeagjib(Hangul: 해악집; Hanja: 海嶽集) volume 1. The poem describes Ulsanbawi in the following: 
It’s north of Seorak, here east of Geumgang. 
High and high peaks that looks like tied up jasper. 
I consider this unfathomable cave to home, 
I must've come to cloud over the sea by wind

Travel essays about Ulsanbawi 
People who lived in the Joseon Dynasty era wrote travel essays after viewing Ulsanbawi. In 1832, people later published a garland named EouJib(Hangul: 어우집; Hanja: 於于集)
based on the posthumous works of Yu Mong In (Hangul: 유몽인; Hanja: 柳夢寅; 1559-1623). In volume 1, he described Ulsanbawi in the following: 

It is called Mount Cheonhu because when a hole of the stone is making a sound, the wind blows. When I came back with a cane, the odd mountain peaks look like bundled up poles. And the flat rocks lay like usual, but the faraway place(천애절벽)settle in a strange way. There is a temple in the cave of Mount Cheonhu and when the wind blows over ten million trees, it seems that the Cheon-gun is advancing with a spear in its hand. 

In 1689, Heo Mok (Hangul: 허목; Hanja: 許|穆; 1595-1682) published Gieon (Hangul:기언; Hanja: 記言). In volume 24 he described Ulsanbawi in the following: 
Mount Cheonhu is another mountain at the eastern shore of Mt. Seorak, and it is located on the southern edge of Suseong. It is marvelous and strikingly beautiful, with nine peaks overlooking the wide sea to the east. The mountain was named Cheonhu because it created a strong breeze when it cried. On the south, there is Seokdalma, and on the north, Seonindae is seen.

Tales

Tales about Ulsanbawi is local narrative. was passed down by Buddhism in Gangwondo Sokcho, South Korea. Second tale is the device to ensure the tale 1 is true.

Ulsan Bawi’s name’s origin 
One day, the god of mountain was making the Mt. Geumgang. He has thought ”How to make the most beautiful mountain” for few days. His conclusion was carving twelve thousands of peaks differently will make the mountain greater.  

Because there isn’t enough rocks, he ordered other big rocks to go to the mountain. So a rock in the Ulsan also went on a trip. But it couldn’t get on time because it was too big and clunky. When Ulsanbawi past Mt. Seorak messenger said that god don’t need more rocks. So don’t come.

It was frustrated and cried. because it has walked so far and he can’t save its face if it goes back to his home. Messenger felt pity for It. So he said ”Mt. Seorak isn’t better than Mt. Geumgang but isn’t Mt. Seorak better than Ulsan?”  

So we call the bawi Ulsanbawi because it was from Ulsan. And there is a lake which made with Ulsan bawi’s tears.

Tale about Ulsanbawi
Thousand of years after Ulsanbawi stayed in Mt. Seorak, Joseon(朝鮮) period. There was a temple under the Ulsanbawi. Someday Ulsan reeve thought he had right to have Ulsanbawi. He envyed Ulsanbawi. He visited the temple and said “ You have to pay tax for Ulsanbawi, or your temple will be closed.” 

It made the temple poor. New chief monk tried hard abolish reeve's unfair order. He didn’t eat for few days to think the way. Then a child monk asked him why, worrying him. After he listened the story, He said he had a solution. 

He said to Ulsan reeve ”We don’t need the Ulsanbawi. It is burden to us. So you have to pay tax to us not we pay tax to you. If you can’t, you have to move the Ulsanbawi to Ulsan.” Reeve said “Then you have to tie up the bawi with burnt rope so that we could take Ulsanbawi to Ulsan. We’ll take it then.” 

The chief thought it was impossible. But child said that they didn’t need to worry. He employed young men to make rope. He soaked the rope in salt water. Then he tied up the Ulsanbawi. Few days after he ignited the rope and it looked like totally burnt. 

After a month reeve came and surprised. He thought the monks will pay tax but they was triumphant. He climbed up the mountain to check it is real. Of course it was real. Reeve sighed “They are so clever, I can’t take tax no more.” 
After that the temple didn’t need to pay tax anymore.

See also
 Seoraksan
 Sinheungsa

References

External links
 김광섭의 고성이야기-울산바위의 역사적 고찰 (goseongnews)
 문화컨텐츠닷컴 (culture content)
 한국민족문화대백과사전 (korean national culture encyclopedia)

Rock formations
Tourist attractions in Gangwon Province, South Korea